Louise Distras is an English musician, singer and songwriter from Wakefield, West Yorkshire. She has received media attention from BBC Radio 1, The Guardian, and Kerrang who described her as "The most exciting voice in UK punk right now." Her upcoming album 'Beauty After Bruises' is due to be released on 28 April 2023.

Early life 
Distras was born in Wakefield, an ex-mining town in the North of England. She taught herself to play the violin at an early age and later learned to play guitar by "bunking off school and smoking cigarettes" and listening to Nirvana's debut album Bleach.  At age 16 she ran away from home. In a 2019 interview with The Chronicle she said "The reason why kids do it is because they feel so desperate that living on the streets or sleeping on a stranger’s floor is better than being at home, and that was the case was for me. So I ended up staying with a lot of dangerous people in dangerous situations, who did ultimately take advantage of me. Being able to escape into song-writing is what got me through."

Career

2012–2015: Career beginnings and Dreams from the Factory Floor 
Louise Distras started playing live in 2012 holding her first shows in pubs, open mic nights and punk co-ops. She uploaded her first song 'The Hand You Hold' to YouTube on International Women's Day picking up media attention from The Guardian, The Independent, and BBC Radio 1. She was invited by Billy Bragg to perform on the Leftfield Stage at Glastonbury Festival who tweeted "Maybe we'd have done better at Eurovision if Louise Distras had been our entry?" In 2015, she released her debut full-length album 'Dreams from the Factory Floor’ and performed across America, Canada, Scandinavia and Europe, opening for The Damned, Buzzcocks, Stiff Little Fingers and Television. Music journalist John Robb called her "the most important protest singer we have" in a review on the Louder Than War website.

2016 – 2019: Nu Punk and Street Revolution EP 
In 2016 Louise Distras premiered her new serial killer themed single 'Aileen' via Kerrang! as a taster for her new material and embarked on a UK and European Tour with The King Blues. Blending Northern Soul and Power Pop 'Aileen' marked a change in musical direction for Louise. The track received radio support from Huw Stephens (BBC Radio 1), John Kennedy (Radio X) and Rodney Bingenheimer (KROQ). It also featured on the Hugs for Chelsea benefit album for transgender whistle blower Chelsea Manning. The compilation premiered on Rolling Stone and also featured Michael Stipe, Tom Morello, and Thurston Moore of Sonic Youth.

Distras also performed on the main stage at Punk Rock Bowling Festival in Las Vegas, NV and headlined the Nick Alexander stage of Frank Turner's Lost Evenings Festival at The Roundhouse in London. After an interview with Skin Back Alley she was subjected to online abuse after making observations about disability hate speech within the punk rock scene. Stating "if the big names of punk have nothing new to offer, then it’s time to step down and make room for the new bands that do." Against the backdrop of the UK general election and #Grime4Corbyn campaign, Distras announced two Punk and Grime collaboration shows under the banner of Nu Punk which were promoted by Live Nation. She was banned from the Rebellion Punk Festival in Blackpool and responded on social media by commenting "it seems I'm too angry for punk!" Kerrang! named Louise Distras a 'Star of 2017' saying "Louise Distras is the most exciting voice in UK punk right now!" and she performed at Glastonbury Festival for a second time under the invitation of Billy Bragg.

In 2018 Louise Distras announced she was working on her sophomore album with producer Ross Petersen (Bruce Springsteen, Elle King, John Mayer) and drummer Gunnar Olsen (Puscifer, Miley Cyrus, Bruce Springsteen) in Oakland, California. Loudersound premiered the music video 'Land of Dope and Glory', an intense and compelling conceptual performance piece directed by MTV VMA nominated director Lewis Cater. "It's inspired by Black Mirror and looks like Crass joined forces with Barbie to create a dystopian TV channel," said Louise. The video was shadowbanned on social media due to its lyrical content around the military industrial complex and the opioid crisis.

In 2019 she released the 'Street Revolution EP' and received more praise from Kerrang! who said "Louise Distras has the kind of voice that could charm the paint from a car". The title track 'Street Revolution' was immediately championed at Radio X being made John Kennedy's ‘X-posure Hot One’ and named as one of DJ Gary Crowley's top tracks of 2019 who said "Street Revolution is a song for our times. It leaps out of the radio". She also played concerts in Germany, supporting The Subways, The Interrupters, Dropkick Murphys and appeared as a special guest on the new King Blues album 38 Minutes. In an interview with She's A Punk podcast Distras said she was experiencing mental health issues as a result of being homeless. She later revealed she was adding finishing touches to her new album at Damon Albarn's (Blur, Gorillaz) Studio 13 in West London.

2020–2022: Covid 19 and Cancel Culture 
In a post on social media, Distras stated that her new album release had been pushed back due to the COVID-19 pandemic's impact on the music industry and was once again being subjected to online abuse.

On 4 November (Mischief Night), Louise Distras released her new single 'Black Skies' which featured a spoken word introduction from Steve Ignorant of Crass. 

 She is outspoken against censorship of working class artists saying "Social media is the toilet of the internet" and "Cancel Culture is just mind games for the middle classes".

2023: New album Beauty After Bruises 
On 27 January Louise Distras announced her long-awaited return in 2023 with her first single 'Girl in the Mirror' from her second album 'Beauty After Bruises' to be released on 28 April via Ministry Of Love Records. 

Distras stated "I don't want to make music that's a space for the best, glossy version of myself so Girl in the Mirror is about the ugly truth. This song is messy just like me and it's about honouring the parts of myself that I looked away from."

'Beauty After Bruises''' was recorded at 25th Street Studios in Oakland, California with American Grammy nominated producer Ross Peterson (Bruce Springsteen, Elle King) and mixed by the English music producer Stephen Street (best known for his work with the Smiths, the Cranberries and Blur). Guest musicians include Mick Talbot (The Style Council / Dexy’s Midnight Runners) on keys, and Puscifer drummer Gunnar Olsen on drums.

 Artistry and style 
Distras's biggest influences include Nirvana, citing their 1989 debut album Bleach as her favourite album. Some of her earlier influences include Bee Gees, Queen, Abba, Sex Pistols, Whitney Houston, Oasis and Lydia Lunch. She incorporates elements of punk rock into her work as well as the classic 1977 punk rock aesthetic, notably in the music videos 'The Hand You Hold' and 'Shades of Hate'. She is also known for retaining her thick Yorkshire accent during interviews and makes no attempt to sing in an American accent. Onstage she often wears Converse trainers, Dr. Martens, Fred Perry shirts and punk inspired jewellery, such as earrings designed by Vivienne Westwood.

 Activism 
Distras describes herself as "a soft feminist rooted in a Northern working class upbringing" and has written for punk fanzines citing Ariel Levy's Female Chauvinist Pigs as one of her biggest influences. In 2012 she supported the Russian feminist band Pussy Riot during their trial in an interview with The Guardian after posting a viral video to YouTube which encouraged her fans to raise awareness, demanding the release of the imprisoned band. She appeared on the BBC Radio 1 documentary "Make Some Noise" and John Pienaar's BBC Radio 5 show Pienaar’s Politics to discuss the role of protest songs in modern music.

In 2015 Louise Distras auctioned 'Dreams from the Factory Floor''' vinyl test pressings on eBay and donated the funds to California non-profit human rights organisation Justice Now, and promoted their anti violence and gender justice message on her USA tour. Justice Now co-ordinated an art project based around 'Dreams from the Factory Floor' lyrics, where people in the Central California Women's Facility (the world's biggest women's prison) illustrated copies of her songs 'The Hand You Hold' and 'Love Me The Way I Am'. The finished art pieces were displayed at various events throughout the year.

Later that year she performed alongside Mick Jones (The Clash) and Glen Matlock (Sex Pistols) at London's Coronet Theatre to raise funds for the London Fire Brigade in Joe Strummer's memory, and appeared live on Channel 4 news to discuss the closing of Kellingley Colliery in Wakefield with poet Matt Abbott and Channel 4 News presenter and Europe editor Matt Frei.

In 2016 she teamed up with Grrrl Movie director Vega Darling and Huffington Post journalist Sydney Chase to make "Real Outlaw", a short DIY film that explored the lyrics behind 'Aileen'. It provided a commentary on the recent US presidential election, rape culture, sex workers, LGBT rights and the power of the riot grrrl movement.

In support of her 2019 Street Revolution EP, Distras performed across the UK and mainland Europe in partnership with Musicians Against Homelessness to raise funds for Crisis charity whilst road testing tracks from the forthcoming new album. She also joined Jon Sparkes (Chief Executive of Crisis), Alan McGee, Shaun Ryder and Neville Staple of The Specials at the Houses of Parliament in London to campaign against homelessness.

Discography

Albums 

 Beauty After Bruises, DD, CD, LP, Ministry Of Love Records Department 2023
 Dreams from the Factory Floor, Street Revolution Records, CD/DD, 2013, Pirates Press Records, LP, 2015

Singles/EPs 
 Girl in the Mirror, DD, Ministry Of Love Records Department 2023
 Black Skies, DD, Ministry Of Love Records Department 2022
 The Hand You Hold, DD, 2012
 Shades of Hate, DD, 2012
 Stand Strong Together, DD, 2013
 Love Me the Way I Am/Bullets, 7", DD, 2014
 Bullets, DD, 2015
 Aileen, CD, DD, 2016
 Outside of You, CD, DD, 2017
 Land of Dope and Glory, DD, 2018
 Street Revolution EP, CD, DD, 2019

Compilation appearances 
 "Aileen" on Hugs for Chelsea, DD, 2016

Collaborations 

 Black Skies by Louise Distras featuring Steve Ignorant, DD, 2022
 Boomer and the Severed Goats Head by The King Blues, 38 Minutes CD, DD, 2019
 Paradise by The King Blues, 38 Minutes CD, DD, 2019

References 

Alternative rock singers